A Lazy Afternoon is a studio album by jazz vocalist/pianist Shirley Horn, which was recorded in 1978 and released on the Danish SteepleChase label.

Reception

In his review for AllMusic, Ken Dryden called it "a fine studio set" additionally commenting: "An always effective vocalist who provided her own top-notch accompaniment on piano, Horn's almost conversational style of singing works very well whether she is swinging an oldie like 'I'm Old Fashioned' or delivering a lush, infectious interpretation of a ballad like 'A Lazy Afternoon'."

Track listing
 "I'm Old Fashioned" (Jerome Kern, Johnny Mercer) – 2:43
 "There's No You" (Hal Hopper, Tom Adair) – 6:14
 "New York's My Home" (Gordon Jenkins) – 2:46
 "Why Did I Choose You?" (Michael Leonard, Herbert Martin) – 6:13
 "Take a Little Time to Smile" (Dave Barbour, Peggy Lee) – 2:59
 "A Lazy Afternoon" (Jerome Moross, John La Touche) – 4:52
 "The Gentle Rain" (Luiz Bonfá, Matt Dubey) – 9:56
 "Gra'ma's Hands" (Bill Withers) – 3:10
 "I'll Go My Way by Myself" (Arthur Schwartz, Howard Dietz) – 3:17

Personnel
Shirley Horn – vocals, piano
Buster Williams – bass 
Billy Hart – drums

References 

1979 albums
Shirley Horn albums
SteepleChase Records albums